The 2001 UCI Cyclo-cross World Championships were held in Tábor, Czech Republic on Saturday February 3 and Sunday February 4, 2001.

Schedule 

 Saturday February 3, 2001
 11:00 Women's Elite
 14:00 Men's Under 23
 Sunday February 4, 2001
 11:00 Men's Juniors
 14:00 Men's Elite

Medal summary

Medal table

Men's Elite
 Held on Sunday February 4, 2001

Women's Elite
 Held on Saturday February 3, 2001

Notes

External links
 Sports123

UCI Cyclo-cross World Championships
World Championships
C
International cycle races hosted by the Czech Republic
February 2001 sports events in Europe